Aram V. Chobanian (born August 10, 1929) served as president ad interim of Boston University from 2003 until June 9, 2005, when, in recognition of Chobanian's work, the Board of Trustees voted to remove “ad interim” from his title and designate him the ninth president of Boston University. He had succeeded John Silber, who had reassumed the presidency on an interim basis after Jon Westling resigned to return to teaching. In September 2005, Chobanian was succeeded by Robert A. Brown as president of Boston University. Chobanian is the first recipient of the Lifetime Achievement Award in Hypertension of the American Heart Association.

A cardiologist, Chobanian holds a B.A. from Brown University and an M.D. from Harvard Medical School. Before accepting the interim position in 2003, he was the Dean of the Boston University School of Medicine.

Relationship with Armenia
An Armenian-American, Chobanian is a member at the board of directors of the Fund for Armenian Relief. He has been involved in several programs to improve health care in Armenia. These have included the training of Armenian physicians, nurses, and other health professionals in emergency medicine, trauma care, and health care management; development of medical residency and post-graduate educational programs in Armenia; establishment of a successful medical student elective program for US medical students to spend one to two months in Armenian hospitals and clinics; and the provision of much-needed medical equipment, supplies, and medications to Armenia.

Chobanian has been elected a Foreign Member of the National Academy of Sciences of Armenia. He is the recipient of the Gold Medal from the Yerevan State Medical University. Catholicos Aram I recently bestowed the St. Mesrob-Mashtots Medal on Chobanian.

References

External links

Official Biography
Board of Directors, Fund for Armenian Relief

1929 births
People from Pawtucket, Rhode Island
American people of Armenian descent
Living people
Presidents of Boston University
Harvard Medical School alumni
Brown University alumni